Kumane is a village located in the Novi Bečej municipality, in the Central Banat District of Serbia. It is situated in the Autonomous Province of Vojvodina. The village has a Serb ethnic majority (86.41%) and its population numbering 3,814 people (2002 census).

Name

In Serbian, the village is known as Kumane (Кумане), in Hungarian as Kumán, and in Croatian as Kumane.

Historical population

1961: 5,233
1971: 4,778
1981: 4,321
1991: 4,068
2002: 3,814
2011: 3,284

See also
List of places in Serbia
List of cities, towns and villages in Vojvodina

References
Slobodan Ćurčić, Broj stanovnika Vojvodine, Novi Sad, 1996.

Populated places in Serbian Banat